Mike Gutmann (born 28 April 1962) is a Swiss former professional racing cyclist. He rode in the 1982 Tour de France.

References

External links
 

1962 births
Living people
Swiss male cyclists
People from Riviera-Pays-d'Enhaut District
Sportspeople from the canton of Vaud